Qubad Talabani (born 21 July 1977) is an Iraqi Kurdish politician who has been  the Deputy Prime Minister of the Kurdistan Region since 2014. Formerly serving as the representative of Kurdistan to the United States, Qubad is the second son of former Iraqi President Jalal Talabani.

Early life 
Deputy Prime Minister Talabani was born in 1977 and grew up in Surrey, United Kingdom with his maternal grandparents, Ibrahim Ahmed, a novelist, poet and a founder of the modern intellectual Kurdish movement and Galawejh Ahmed (also a novelist). His family has been involved in Kurdish politics for decades; His father, Jalal Talabani, was the President of the Republic of Iraq from 2005 until 2014.

After graduating from High School, he obtained a Diploma in Motor Vehicle Engineering at Carshalton College, and later received a degree in Mechanical Engineering at the Kingston University in London.

Political career 
From 2001 to 2003, Qubad worked as a special assistant to  Barham Salih, at that time the Representative of the Patriotic Union of Kurdistan (one of Iraq's leading Kurdish political parties) in Washington D.C., and later as the Deputy PUK Representative. In 2003, he returned to Kurdistan for one year and served as the PUK's Senior Foreign Relations officer to the coalition forces and the Coalition Provisional Authority. He also acted as a liaison officer between the PUK and U.S. military forces in Iraq. He was a leading negotiator in the drafting of the Transitional Administrative Law (TAL), the first Iraqi constitution since the overthrow of Saddam Hussein.

In April 2004, Qubad returned to the US, and was stationed as the Representative of the PUK and Kurdistan.

In 2006, with the unification of the two administrations in Kurdistan and following the forming of the Democratic Patriotic Alliance of Kurdistan and the establishment of the Kurdish National Assembly, Qubad was appointed as the first representative of the Kurdistan Region, a position he has held until 2012 In 2014 he was nominated Deputy Prime Minister of the Government of the Kurdistan region and was involved in the implementation of the biometric registration system for government employees.

He was first sworn in as Deputy Prime Minister of the KRG Cabinet in June 2014, where he took office. Receiving no fiscal transfers from the Government of Iraq (GoI), coupled with rapidly declining oil prices, the Kurdistan region was in the midst of a severe financial crisis. Moreover, the Islamic State was rampaging its way throughout Iraq, claiming territory and establishing itself as one of history's most brutal terrorist organizations, resulting in a major humanitarian crisis that forced 1.8 million people to flee war and violence and seek refuge in the Kurdistan region. During this period, the KRG successfully oversaw a package of reforms.

A major part of the KRG's economic reform plan included improving oversight of government expenditures. To that end, Talabani successfully oversaw the design and implementation of his government's biometric registration program.

During the KRG's Seventh Cabinet, Talabani established and headed up the Department of Coordination and Follow-up to facilitate inter-ministerial coordination. He directed that KRG agency on behalf of the Prime Minister for two years.

In the parliamentary elections of the Kurdistan region of 2018 he was elected to parliament but he did not assume his post.

In the fourth congress of the PUK in December 2019, he was appointed to the leadership council of the PUK.

Personal life 
Talabani is the son of Jalal Talabani and Hero Ibrahim Ahmed and lives in Erbil with his wife Sherri Kraham to who he got married in 2005 in Il Castello del Palagio in Italy. The couple have two children, Ari and Lara.

References

External links
 Qubad Talabani's blog
 Profile at SourceWatch

 List of presidents of Iraq

1977 births
Living people
Alumni of Kingston University
Patriotic Union of Kurdistan politicians
Children of national leaders
Kurdish politicians
Government of Kurdistan Region
People from Damascus